The women's heptathlon at the 2022 European Athletics Championships is taking place at the Olympiastadion on 17 and 18 August.

Records

Schedule

Results

100 metres hurdles

High jump

Shot put

200 metres

Long jump

Javelin throw

800 metres

Final standings

References

Heptathlon
Combined events at the European Athletics Championships
Euro